Deone Ariel Bucannon (pronounced DAY-own) (born August 30, 1992) is a former American football linebacker. He was drafted by the Arizona Cardinals in the first round of the 2014 NFL draft. He played college football at Washington State. Originally drafted as a safety, Bucannon transitioned to play a hybrid safety-linebacker role in the Cardinals's 3-4 defense.

Early years
Bucannon attended Vanden High School in Fairfield, California. As a senior, he recorded 107 tackles, including four sacks, and had two interceptions and two fumble recoveries. He also caught 20 passes for 264 yards and a touchdown on offense, and led Vanden to the second round of the CIF Sac-Joaquin Section Division III playoffs. He garnered his second-straight SCAC Defensive Player of the Year honor, in addition to all-league and all-city honors. In his junior year, he totaled 140 tackles, three sacks, three interceptions and two fumble recoveries, winning his first Solano County Athletic Conference Player of the Year award and being named All-CIF Sac-Joaquin Section and City Defensive Player of the Year.

Considered a three-star recruit by Rivals.com, he was rated as the 45th best safety prospect of his class.

College career
Bucannon attended Washington State University from 2010 to 2013. As a senior in 2013, he was a First-team All-Pac-12 and first-team All-American selection. He finished his career with 384 tackles and 15 interceptions.

Professional career
Bucannon was considered one of the top safety prospects for the 2014 NFL Draft.

Arizona Cardinals

2014
Bucannon was selected by the Arizona Cardinals as the 27th pick of the first round of the 2014 NFL Draft.

On June 5, 2014, Bucannon signed a four-year, $7.7 million contract with a $3.92 million signing bonus and $6.23 million guaranteed. The contract also included a fifth-year option.

Bucannon began his first season starting as the strong safety. On September 8, 2014, he earned his first career start in the season opener against the San Diego Chargers and finished his first game with five tackles. During a Week 5 loss to the Denver Broncos, he finished with a season-high seven solo tackles. In a 24-20 win over the Philadelphia Eagles on October 26, he recorded a season-high eight total tackles and a pass deflection. On November 9, 2014, Bucannon, racked up five total tackles (four solo) and his first career sack in a 31-14 victory over the St. Louis Rams. After finishing the season 11-5, the Cardinals played the Carolina Panthers in a Wild-card game on January 3, 2015. In his first playoff game, he recorded six total tackles (five solo) and a pass deflection.

During his rookie season, he finished with 83 total tackles, 66 solo tackles, two sacks, two pass deflections, and a forced fumbles in nine starts and 16 games. Throughout his first season, he split starts with veteran Tony Jefferson.

2015
With so many talented safeties on the Cardinals' roster, Bucannon was supposed to be used as a rotational or back-up strong safety for the 2015 NFL season. After inside linebacker Sean Weatherspoon was injured during training camp, head coach Bruce Arians asked Bucannon to make the switch to inside linebacker. Although undersized for a linebacker, Bucannon proved effective. He was listed as the "$LB" or Money linebacker on the Cardinal's depth chart. On October 11, 2015, Bucannon recorded a season-high 11 tackles (nine solo) in a 42-17 victory over the Detroit Lions. Throughout the first six games, he led his team in tackles.

On November 27, 2015, after a hit on Cincinnati Bengals wide receiver A. J. Green the previous game, Bucannon was fined $23,152 for a hit on a defenseless receiver.

In a Week 10 game against the Seattle Seahawks, he earned his first sack of the season while also recording seven total tackles in a 39-32 victory. On December 20, 2015, Bucannon intercepted Eagles quarterback Sam Bradford and returned it for a 39-yard touchdown, marking the first touchdown in his career. He also finished the game with 11 tackles and a pass deflection in the Cardinal's 40-17 victory over Philadelphia. In 16 starts of 2015, Bucannon recorded 112 tackles, three sacks, two fumble recoveries, three forced fumbles, three passes defended, and an interception returned for a touchdown.

2016
Bucannon started 13 games in 2016, recording 91 tackles and four passes defensed before being placed on injured reserve on December 13, 2016 with an ankle injury.

2017
On April 26, 2017, the Cardinals picked up the fifth-year option on Bucannon's contract. On May 16, it was revealed that Bucannon underwent ankle surgery.

2018
In 2018, Bucannon played in 13 games with six starts, recording a career-low 38 tackles, one sack, and a forced fumble.

Tampa Bay Buccaneers
On March 13, 2019, Bucannon signed with the Tampa Bay Buccaneers on a one year $2.5 million contract. On October 9, 2019, he was released by the Buccaneers.

New York Giants

On October 22, 2019, Bucannon signed with the New York Giants.

Atlanta Falcons
On May 26, 2020, Bucannon signed with the Atlanta Falcons. On September 8, 2020, Bucannon was released and due to new COVID-19 roster management rules, was re-signed to the practice squad the next day. He was released on September 29, 2020.

Tampa Bay Buccaneers (second stint)
On January 6, 2021, Bucannon signed with the practice squad of the Tampa Bay Buccaneers. He was elevated to the active roster on January 8 and January 16 for the team's wild card and divisional playoff games against the Washington Football Team and New Orleans Saints, and reverted to the practice squad after each game. Bucannon was promoted to the active roster on January 19, 2021.

NFL career statistics

References

External links
Washington State Cougars bio

1992 births
Living people
American football safeties
Arizona Cardinals players
Atlanta Falcons players
New York Giants players
People from Fairfield, California
Players of American football from Oakland, California
Tampa Bay Buccaneers players
Washington State Cougars football players